The following is a list of the hospitals in Quebec City, Quebec, Canada.

Centre hospitalier universitaire de Québec 
Centre hospitalier universitaire de Québec (CHUQ):
 Hôtel-Dieu de Québec
 Hôpital Saint-François d'Assise
 Saint Brigid's – Jeffery Hale Hospital
 Centre hospitalier de l'Université Laval (CHUL)

Affiliate institutions
 Foyer des vétérans - Located at the CHUL, shelter and permanent long-term care for veterans
 Centre mère-enfant - Located at the CHUL, care of newborns and their mothers, children and future mothers of the city
 Maison Paul-Triquet - Shelter for long-term care for veterans
 Centre de traitement en santé mentale dans la communauté - Located in Sillery, care of patients with psychiatric problems
 Centre de pédopsychiatrie - Located in the former building of the Hôtel-Dieu du Sacré-Cœur de Jésus, care of children (0-17) with psychiatric problems

Institutions affiliated with University Laval
 Centre hospitalier affilié universitaire de Québec (CHA)
 Hôpital de l'Enfant-Jésus
 Hôpital du Saint-Sacrement
 Institut universitaire en santé mentale  de Québec (Mental Health University Institute of Quebec) - Located in Beauport (formerly called Hôpital Robert-Giffard)
 Institut universitaire de cardiologie et de pneumologie de Québec (IUCPQ) - (formerly called Hôpital anti-syndical)

See also
List of hospitals in Canada

References

Quebec City
Quebec City
Hospitals in Quebec City